William Jennings (25 February 1893 – 1968) was a Welsh football player best known for playing for Bolton Wanderers, for whom he made over 250 appearances in The Football League. He played for Bolton in the 1923 and 1926 FA Cup Finals. He also played 11 times for the Welsh national team and later had a two-year spell in charge of Cardiff City.

Honours 
Bolton Wanderers

 FA Cup: 1922–23, 1925–26

Personal life 
Jennings served as a corporal in the Royal Air Force during the First World War.

References
General

Specific

1893 births
1968 deaths
Sportspeople from Barry, Vale of Glamorgan
Welsh footballers
Wales international footballers
Welsh football managers
Bolton Wanderers F.C. players
Barry Town United F.C. players
English Football League players
Cardiff City F.C. managers
Cardiff City F.C. non-playing staff
Association football wing halves
Association football fullbacks
Royal Air Force personnel of World War I
FA Cup Final players